"Caretaker" is the series premiere of the American science fiction television series Star Trek: Voyager. It was first broadcast as a double-length episode on January 16, 1995, as the first telecast of the fledgling UPN network. It was later split into two parts for syndication, but released in its original one-episode format on DVD and streaming services. Set in the 24th century, the series follows the adventures of the Starfleet and Maquis crew of the starship USS Voyager after they are stranded in the Delta Quadrant far from the rest of the Federation.

The premiere was watched by 21.3 million people in 1995. The episode won two Emmy awards, and launched the show into a seven season run that concluded in 2001.

Original broadcast and UPN 
"Caretaker" aired on the United Paramount Network on January 16, 1995. It aired as a single 90-minute show, although later it was also played as two separate roughly-45-minute episodes.  "Caretaker" marked the debut of a then-new Star Trek series launching along with Paramount's new television network, United Paramount Network, or UPN, coming on the heels of previous Star Trek series. The premiere aired between 8-10 p.m. on that Monday; however, the network's content was also aired on affiliate channels that may or may not have delayed the first showing in their television region. In other words, "Caretaker" was also aired on UPN affiliate channels, such as KCOP-TV in Los Angeles and WPWR-TV in Chicago. The way channels worked, an episode played on one channel in a certain order decided by the broadcaster, and viewers would then change "channels" to watch that broadcast in real time. In the case of the Voyager premiere, in some markets the episode aired in competition with other Star Trek shows, like DS9 and TNG re-runs.

"Caretaker" was the debut episode of the new series Star Trek: Voyager which, while less popular than its predecessors, drew in a consistent set of viewers over seven years of episodes.

Plot
A scrolling text introduces the Cardassian and Federation relationship with the Maquis rebels. The opening scene shows the Cardassians pursuing a smaller Maquis spacecraft that escapes into the Badlands, a volatile nebula. The Cardassian vessel is damaged by a plasma storm and the Maquis ship is caught in a displacement wave.

On Earth, Captain Kathryn Janeway of the Federation starship USS Voyager recruits Tom Paris, disgraced former Starfleet officer and now a captured Maquis member, to help find the missing Maquis spacecraft. Janeway is searching for Tuvok, her security officer who was a spy aboard the Maquis ship. Departing Deep Space Nine, Voyager journeys to the Badlands, where it is scanned by a "coherent tetryon beam" before a displacement wave hits and wreaks havoc on the ship.

The crew recovers and find themselves in the Delta Quadrant, over 70,000 light years from Federation space. Fatalities include Voyager'''s second-in-command, helm officer, chief engineer, and medical staff. The Emergency Medical Hologram is activated to treat the injured. Before determining their bearings, the crew is transported to a holographic simulation aboard a nearby array controlled by a being known as the Caretaker. Seeing through the simulation, the Voyager crew discover the unconscious Maquis crew undergoing strange medical experiments. The Voyager crew are subjected to the same experiments. Later, both crews awaken on their own vessels and find each are missing one crew member: Harry Kim from Voyager, and the Maquis' B'Elanna Torres. Attempts to negotiate with the Caretaker are fruitless as he insists there is "no time". Janeway offers to work with Maquis leader Chakotay, a former Starfleet officer, to find missing crew and return to the Alpha Quadrant.

The two ships follow energy pulses sent from the array to a nearby planet. En route, they encounter Neelix, a space trader eager to assist them in exchange for water and rescuing his companion, the Ocampa Kes, from the violent Kazon that inhabit the planet's surface. Kes' people live in a subterranean complex, cared for by the Caretaker who supplies them with energy and other essentials. The only expectation is that they tend to any beings sent to them, each suffering an incurable disease. As the crews determine how to rescue Kim and Torres, the Caretaker realigns the array and fires more frequent energy bursts. Vulcan security chief Tuvok deduces that the Caretaker is dying and is ensuring the Ocampa are kept safe by sealing the underground complex, though eventually their resources will be depleted. With time running short, a combined away team penetrates the shields protecting the complex and rescues Kim and Torres.

The crews again ask the Caretaker to return them to the Alpha Quadrant. He reveals that he was part of an ancient alien race whose technology accidentally destroyed the Ocampan planet's atmosphere, leaving it lifeless. In recompense, he and another of his race have cared for the Ocampa ever since. His companion having long moved on, he experiments on species from distant galactic sectors hoping to find a compatible match so that he could reproduce and pass the responsibility to his offspring. Nearing death, the Caretaker initiates the array's self-destruct sequence to prevent the technology from falling to the Kazon. As the Caretaker dies, the ships are attacked by a Kazon fleet. Janeway and Chakotay coordinate a counterattack to protect the array; Chakotay sacrifices his vessel to destroy a Kazon ship, but the damaged array disables the self-destruct sequence. Janeway opts to respect the Caretaker's wishes and orders the array destroyed, despite it being their only chance at returning home. With the array destroyed, the Kazon disengage. Their leader informs Janeway she has made an enemy.

As Voyager begins a 75-year journey back to the Alpha Quadrant, Janeway integrates the Maquis into the Starfleet crew, with Chakotay as her second-in-command. Janeway re-instates Paris as a Starfleet officer holding the rank of Lieutenant and assigns him as helmsman. Neelix and Kes join the crew as guides.

Casting

Due to the nature of the plot, the rest of series has a different set of crew starting with the next (third) episode:

Main bridge characters in "Caretaker" of Voyager Captain Kathryn Janeway (Kate Mulgrew), who commands the starship USS Voyager
 Lt. Commander Cavit (Scott Jaeck),  Voyager's first officer when they set out from Deep Space Nine
Lieutenant Stadi (Alicia Coppola), the Betazoid Helm Officer
 Ensign Harry Kim (Garrett Wang), the Operations Officer
Tom Paris (Robert Duncan McNeill), Observer/Maquis consultant
 Lt. Tuvok (Tim Russ), he is the Security/Tactical officer of Voyager but is working as a spy on Maquis ship Val JeanAs the episode progresses, more characters are introduced; see Cast of Star Trek: Voyager.

Quark has a scene in this episode, who was a main cast character on the show Star Trek: Deep Space Nine, which was in production concurrently with Star Trek: Voyager at this time. By the end of the episode, several major characters for Voyager are introduced, including Neelix and Kes. Torres, Chakotay, and Tuvok are also introduced as being on the Voyager spacecraft, and several other characters that were introduced, such as Stadi, are lost. Since the spacecraft is moved to the Delta Quadrant, they are also cut off from communication with Deep Space Nine and Starfleet at that time.

Production
Filming began on September 6, 1994, with the scenes set on Deep Space Nine. Scenes with Geneviève Bujold, the first actress chosen to play Captain Nicole Janeway, were filmed with her over September 7 and 8. Bujold and the director Winrich Kolbe reportedly disagreed over Bujold's performance: Bujold insisted on playing the role in a more restrained way than Kolbe wanted. She departed on her second day of filming and production was suspended until September 12, when filming of scenes without Janeway recommenced. Actresses reported as possible replacements for Bujold included Joanna Cassidy, Susan Gibney, Elizabeth Dennehy, Tracy Scoggins, and Lindsay Crouse. Kate Mulgrew was cast as Captain Kathryn Janeway, from among four actresses recalled from the original round of auditions, and shooting of her scenes began on September 19. Several of Bujold's scenes can be seen on the Season One DVD extras.

"Caretaker" took 31 days to shoot, and was filmed at multiple locations. The production of the episode remains one of the most expensive in television history, reportedly costing $23 million.

The has similarities to Gene Roddenberry's Andromeda, which also features a hologram, a starship transported by an anomaly into a new alien landscape and the deaths of bridge officers and their replacement with a misfit crew. The scenes of medical experiments on the array appear to pay homage to Bujold's 1978 film Coma, and the opening sequence of the episode—a text crawl followed by a small spaceship being chased by a larger one—mirrors the opening of Star Wars.

The art department for Voyager was based out of the Dreier building at Paramount Studios.

 Special effect model 
In late October 1994, the USS Voyager model was delivered to Image G, who did the motion-control photography video work with the model for the special effects shots. The model was delivered by Tony Meineger to Image G, which was also motion control photography for the Caretaker Array, Maquis ship, and Kazon space ship. The production schedule was packed with other work, but special effect shots for Voyager were needed for the "Caretaker" and also "Parallax" episodes at that time.

Sets
Many of the main sets for the series were located at Stage 8 and Stage 9 at Paramount Studios.

An example of the complexity of some of the sets is the bridge of the Voyager spacecraft. The bridge had 11 different monitors of three different sizes, that had custom graphics displayed depending on what was being shot for each scene. For example, for a scene with the "red alert" setting, the appropriate video graphics would have to be displayed on cue. These graphics were created by a team of people, with a need for both static and video graphics. The videos were recorded to videocassette to be played at the right time, such as when an actor is looking at a monitor. For "Caretaker" due to changes, and re-shoots there was some very difficult deadlines on having graphics ready for shots, and often involved discussions between staff.

Awards
"Caretaker" won two Emmy awards, for "Outstanding Individual Achievement in Main Title Theme Music" and "Outstanding Individual Achievement in Special Visual Effects".

Reception
In 2012, Den of Geek ranked "Caretaker" the seventh best episode of the series retrospectively.The Hollywood Reporter ranked "Caretaker" among the 100 best episodes in the Star Trek franchise, and noted its similarity to the Next Generation universe, where the Enterprise was often transported to a distant location from which the crew were expected to escape. Two examples of this are "Where No One Has Gone Before" and "The Price", in the latter of which a spacecraft is stranded in the Delta Quadrant, just like Voyager. Voyager encounters the characters from "The Price" in the third-season episode "False Profits".Variety found "Caretaker" to be a worthy launch of a Star Trek series, calling it "impressive" and praising the design of the Intrepid-class Voyager spaceship.

On the other hand, "Caretaker" marked a reduction in viewers from the last episode of The Next Generation, which had over 30 million viewers when it concluded the previous year in early 1994. Voyager was not able to maintain the viewership achieved with "Caretaker" (21.3 million), but did achieve average ratings and seven seasons of production. As with Deep Space Nine, it had consistently lower ratings than The Next Generation but managed to be successful in expanding the Star Trek franchise and fill the popular appetite for Star Trek shows that had grown to a frenzy in the 1990s. Although "Caretaker" successfully established the characters and their predicament, reviewers complain that the integration of the two disparate crews so quickly is unconvincing, and too many plot points are left unexplained, such as how Neelix and Kes met and how Kim and Torres were cured.

The cross-over to Star Trek: Deep Space Nine has been noted, such as the scene where actor Armin Shimerman playing the character Quark talks to Harry and Paris.

In 2015, a Star Trek: Voyager binge-watching guide by Wired suggested this episode could not be skipped.

In 2016, The Hollywood Reporter said this was the 84th best episode of all Star Trek television. The same year they ranked "Caretaker" the 14th best episode of the Star Trek: Voyager, remarking: "The series premiere for Voyager promised a Star Trek like none before it" but noting its ties to Star Trek The Next Generation that ended its runs several months prior.

In 2017, Den of Geek rated "Caretaker" among top fifty episodes of all Star Trek, noting that it launched a new television series and was a "landmark". The very diverse set of characters and for the first time, a woman captain as a main character. This paid homage to Roddenberry's egalitarian vision of the future, when he included the female Number One character as second-in command of the Enterprise in the original 1965 pilot of Star Trek, "The Cage". The actress that played that character, Majel Barrett, also has the role of a voice-actor for Voyager's computer in "Caretaker". In 2017, GameSpot ranked this as the 3rd best pilot episode of a Star Trek series.

Alicia Coppola, the actress who played Lieutenant Stadi in the episode, remarked that the role was "a great part".

In 2016, SyFy ranked "Caretaker" as the fourth best out of six main Star Trek TV show pilots made up to that time. They felt that the "first act does a fine job of building both characters and tension", and was overall very ambitious. Despite these strengths, they did note a number of issues ranging from questions about the plot, science fiction technology and characters.

In July 2019, Screen Rant ranked "Caretaker" as one of the top five episodes of Star Trek: Voyager, noting how it introduced characters with an exciting plot and made use of Deep Space Nine by having a stopover there.

In 2020, Tor.com rated "Caretaker" five out of ten, noting that while it was good introduction to the series they felt they had "fudged details".

In 2020, SyFy ranked this the 15th best episode of Star Trek: Voyager.Releases
"Caretaker" was released multiple times on VHS in various markets after its showing in 1995. The first VHS release in the United Kingdom was in June 1995 by the company CIC. By the 2010s, it was noted as a struggle to record VHS history, with some universities trying to save libraries of the cassettes. "Caretaker" was released as various sets, for example in the VHS set The Four Beginnings, which included the first episodes of TOS, TNG, DS9 and Voyager.

"Caretaker" was released on PAL-format LaserDisc in the United Kingdom as part of The Pilots collection, in April 1996. This collection included the color version of "The Cage", "Where No Man Has Gone Before", "Encounter at Farpoint", "Emissary" and "Caretaker", with a total runtime of 379 minutes.

"Caretaker" was released on VHS tapes on April 4, 2000, and on DVD in 2004 and 2017 as part of the Season 1 Voyager DVD set when the whole Voyager series was released.

The soundtrack, with works by Jay Chattaway and Jerry Goldsmith was released on compact disc on October 17, 1995. The release also includes a text pamphlet with various facts about the composers in regards to the "Caretaker" soundtrack.

On the launch of the Paramount+ streaming service, on March 4, 2021, a one day only free Star Trek marathon was presented, featuring the first episodes of the various Star Trek television series, including "Caretaker". The marathon started at 7 am PT/10 am ET and was Live streamed on the YouTube internet video platform, going through each episode chronologically in order of release with "Caretaker" airing between "Emissary" and "Broken Bow".

Novel
A novelization of "Caretaker" was released as a 278-page novel, and also as an audiobook in 1995 by Simon & Schuster. The novelized version of the story was written by L.A. Graf.
In the first season of Voyager'' it is estimated the return journey will take 75 years. In the last episode "Endgame" the teaser shows that "Voyager" returned home after 23 years; with changes - Chokotay is dead after his wife Seven of Nine was killed on an away mission and Tuvok is falling victim to a disease that is breaking his mind. On the 10th anniversary of Voyager's return Admiral Janeway goes back in time to the seventh year of Voyager's exile and sacrifices herself so the Borg Transwarp gateway and the Borg Queen are destroyed, while Voyager gets home to Earth. Ultimately the journey takes seven years.

References

External links

 

Star Trek: Voyager (season 1) episodes
American television series premieres
1995 American television episodes
Television episodes written by Rick Berman
Star Trek: Voyager episodes in multiple parts
Emmy Award-winning episodes

sv:Lista över avsnitt av Star Trek: Voyager#Säsong 1